Donald Hunsberger (born August 2, 1932 in Souderton, Pennsylvania) is an American conductor and arranger. He served as the conductor of the Eastman Wind Ensemble from 1965 until 2001.  He also held the position of Professor of conducting at the Eastman School of Music. Generally regarded as a key contributor to the rise of the modern wind ensemble in the twentieth century, Hunsberger's notable contributions include conducting, recording, and arranging music for winds.

Biography
Hunsberger was born August 2, 1932 in Souderton, Pennsylvania. In 1962, he was appointed conductor of the Eastman Symphony Band and coordinator of the Instrumental Ensemble Program. In 1965, following the departure of Clyde Roller, Hunsberger was appointed as conductor of the Eastman Wind Ensemble, which had been created by Frederick Fennell. During his tenure with the Eastman Wind Ensemble, Hunsberger conducted many recordings, including some with trumpeter Wynton Marsalis. Through his work as a conductor, author, and recording artist, Hunsberger helped further the principles of the wind ensemble concept, including "specified instrumentation, orchestral concept of performance, single performer approach [and] development of individual tone colors.". From 1985-87, Hunsberger served as the president of the College Band Directors National Association.

Arrangements and published works
Hunsberger has also arranged transcriptions of orchestral music for concert band. Among these include: Shostakovich's Festive Overture; Kabalevsky's Colas Breugnon Overture, Grafulla's Echoes of the 1860s, Khachaturian's Ballet Suite from Spartacus, and John Williams' Star Wars Trilogy. Hunsberger is also the editor for the Remington Warm Up Series. Hunsberger co-authored a book with Roy Ernst called The Art of Conducting, wrote a newsletter for MCA Music on Wind Ensemble Music, and many other articles. In 1994 he co-edited a book with Frank J. Cipolla called The Wind Ensemble and Its Repertoire: Essays on the Fortieth Anniversary of the Eastman Wind Ensemble.

Recent years
In recent years, Hunsberger has rescored music for silent films, and has conducted performances with major symphony orchestras. Hunsberger is currently conductor emeritus of the Eastman Wind Ensemble.

Selected bibliography
 Cipolla, Frank J., and Donald Hunsberger, eds. The Wind Band in and Around New York CA. 1830–1950. Belwin-Mills, 2007. 
 Cipolla, Frank J., and Donald Hunsberger, eds. The Wind Ensemble and Its Repertoire: Essays on the Fortieth Anniversary of the Eastman Wind Ensemble. University of Rochester Press, 1994. 
 Hunsberger, Donald. "Wind Band: Here Today - Where Tomorrow? Music Journal 26:10 (December 1968), 36.  (reprints); ;  (microform)
 Hunsberger, Donald, and Roy Ernst. The Art of Conducting. New York: Alfred A. Knopf, 1983.

Selected discography
 Eastman Wind Ensemble, Donald Hunsberger, conductor. American Music for Symphonic Winds. Decca DL 710163, 1968. 
 Eastman Wind Ensemble, Donald Hunsberger, conductor. Homespun America (three record set). Vox Box SVBX 5309, 1976. 
 Eastman Wind Ensemble, Donald Hunsberger, conductor/arranger, Wynton Marsalis, cornet soloist. Carnaval. CBS Masterworks IM421137, 1986. 
 Eastman Wind Ensemble, Donald Hunsberger, conductor. Live in Osaka. Sony Music SK47198, 1990.

References

1932 births
Living people
People from Souderton, Pennsylvania
American conductors (music)
American male conductors (music)
University and college band directors
Eastman School of Music faculty
Classical musicians from Pennsylvania